Ihana Dhillon is a popular Indian actress who is working in both Bollywood and Punjabi film industry. 

Dhillon made her Bollywood debut with the movie Hate Story 4, garnering the attention of critics across the nation. Her multilingual abilities have helped her achieve success in sensational Punjabi movies like Daddy Cool Munde Fool (2013), Tiger (2016) andThug Life (2017). 

Dhillon is about to appear on the big screens yet again in the eagerly anticipated film Nastik directed by Shailesh Varma, starring Arjun Rampal. She also made an appearance in a big budget movie Radhe starring Salman Khan in May 2021. In 2020, she was spotted at 6th position in the list of The Most Desirable Woman of Chandigarh.

Career
After completing her studies, she worked with Hotel Crown Plaza, Atlanta, where her looks fetched the attention of a modelling agency and they offered her an assignment. This is how her modelling career started in Atlanta. After moving back to India, she did her first television show, Jewels of Royals, in 2010 with actress Liza Ray for channel TLC.
In 2013, she did her debut movie Daddy Cool Munde Fool and received recognition in the Punjabi film industry for her role as Minki, a small town girl who cares for the wishes and wellbeing of her mother.

One of the many diverse roles in her career is that of Ekum, a Journalist from Canada who comes to Jangpura to know more about how women deal with men who are drug addicts, in her movie Tiger (2016) starring Sippy Gill.

In the movie Thug life, released in 2017, she played the role of Ruchi, a struggling actor who later becomes a con artist with a gang of three men and dupe affluent people to make loads of money.

In 2018, she made her Bollywood debut with the movie Hate Story IV'" directed by Vishal Pandya, starring Urvashi Rautela, Vivan Bhatena, and Karan Wahi, performing the role of Rishma, a corporate lady who seeks revenge for the murder of her fiancé.

As of now, Dhillon is actively involved in Punjabi and Hindi film industry. In 2019, she appeared in Punjabi film Blackia, a critical and commercial success.

In June 2020, Dhillon made her Hindi digital debut with Ullu Original web series, Kasak for which she was nominated for Filmfare Best Actress OTT award in 2020. She even appeared in 4 songs in 2020 out of which 2 are Punjabi songs, Baarish & Khaas and 2 Hindi language songs, Meri Aashiqui & Bewafa Tera Masoom Chehra.

In 2021 Dhillon had multiple releases, Radhe which released in May 2021 on Zee 5 starring Salman Khan. Bhuj: The Pride of India had released on Disney+Hotstar on 13 August 2021 starring Ajay Devgn and Ammy Virk.

On 25 August 2022 her multistarrer Punjabi movie  Bhoot Uncle Tusi Great Ho  released in Cinemas in which she played lead role along with Raj Babbar and Jaya Prada.Her Punjabi films Golgappe and Ghulam had been delayed due to the pandemic are also eyeing for 2022 release. Also, her film Nastik opposite Arjun Rampal has delayed since 2019.

Filmography

Films

Web series

Music videos

References

External links
 

Indian film actresses
Punjabi people
Actresses in Hindi cinema
Actresses in Punjabi cinema
Year of birth missing (living people)
Living people